Knightswood St. Margaret's Parish Church is a parish church of the Church of Scotland, serving part of the Knightswood area of Glasgow, Scotland.

History
The church was planned by the Church of Scotland's Presbytery of Dumbarton in response to the plans of Glasgow Corporation to build a large new housing estate in the area. It was then separated from the parishes of Temple and Drumchapel, both daughter parishes in turn from New Kilpatrick in Bearsden which had previously overseen the area when it was rural.

The church is located at 2000 Great Western Road. The church hall was opened in 1925 and was used as the church for the first seven years. The current church was designed by the architect Sir Robert Lorimer and was dedicated in 1932. It is built entirely of stone, the last stone church to be built in Scotland.

Ministry
The congregation is part of the Church of Scotland's Presbytery of Glasgow and is currently vacant following the retiral of the Rev Sandy Fraser.

The previous minister, the Rev Adam Dillon, is now minister of St David's Memorial Park in Kirkintilloch.

Another former minister (1977–1989) was the Very Rev Dr David Lacy, who was Moderator of the General Assembly of the Church of Scotland in 2005–2006.

See also
List of Church of Scotland parishes
St. John's Renfield Church, Glasgow – another nearby Church of Scotland congregation

External links
Official website
St. David’s Parish Church, Knightswood – another nearby Church of Scotland congregation

References

Church of Scotland churches in Glasgow
Category B listed buildings in Glasgow
Listed churches in Glasgow
1925 establishments in Scotland
Churches completed in 1932